The Destruction of Stocking Frames, etc. Act 1812 (52 Geo 3 c. 16), also known as the Frame-Breaking Act and before passage as the Frame Work Bill, was an Act of Parliament passed by the British Government in 1812 aimed at increasing the penalties for Luddite behaviour in order to discourage it.

Passage and content
The Frame Work Bill was introduced to Parliament on 14 February 1812 by the Home Secretary Richard Ryder, acting in concert with Spencer Perceval (who was at that time both Chancellor of the Exchequer and Prime Minister), the Attorney General Sir Vicary Gibbs, the Solicitor General Sir Thomas Plomer, and three Nottinghamshire MPs concerned about the Luddite Movement taking hold in their constituencies. Rushed through as an "emergency measure", the Act was passed with an overwhelming majority and received royal assent on 20 March, despite opposition. Fundamentally, there was agreement between members of the government and the opposition that the measure was a last resort; but where supporters believed that all other avenues had been exhausted, opponents (seeing relative tranquillity over the winter period) did not. The newly created Lord Byron used his maiden speech in the House of Lords to oppose the bill.

The Act, as passed, made the destruction of mechanised looms – stocking frames – a capital felony (and hence a crime punishable by death). Similarly raised to the level of capital felony were the associated crimes of damaging frames and entering a property with intent to damage a frame. In these respects the act was a stronger version of the Protection of Stocking Frames, etc. Act 1788, which had made similar acts punishable by 7–14 years in a penal colony. All measures included in the Act were only to be applied temporarily, and were duly set to expire on 1 March 1814.

Significance
Although approximately 60 to 70 Luddites were hanged in the period that the statute was in force, no death sentences seem to have been justified on its grounds, with judges preferring to use existing legislation. Due to come to an end on 1 March, the Act was officially repealed in 1814 with the passage of the Destruction of Stocking Frames, etc. Act 1813, which instituted a new maximum penalty for the destruction of stocking frames of life transportation; in 1817, that Act would itself be repealed and the death penalty once again reinstated in the Destroying Stocking Frames, etc. Act 1817. By that time, however, Luddism had largely subsided as a movement.

See also
UK labour law

References

External links 
 Full text of the act on Google Books
 Full text of the act transcribed
 Lord Byron's Speech in the House of Lords concern the Act

United Kingdom Acts of Parliament 1812
1812 in economics